WNDY-TV (channel 23) is a television station licensed to Marion, Indiana, United States, serving the Indianapolis area as an affiliate of MyNetworkTV. It is locally owned by Circle City Broadcasting alongside Indianapolis-licensed CW affiliate WISH-TV (channel 8) and low-power, Class A getTV affiliate WIIH-CD (channel 17). The stations share studios on North Meridian Street (at the north end of the Television Row section) on the near north side of Indianapolis; WNDY-TV and WISH-TV also share transmitter facilities on Walnut Drive in the Augusta section of the city's northwest side (near Meridian Hills). Despite Marion being WNDY-TV's city of license, the station maintains no physical presence there.

History

Early history
The station first signed on the air on October 19, 1987, as WMCC. Founded by G. J. Robinson, it originally operated as an independent station; it ran mostly paid programming, but slowly added classic sitcoms, cartoons and older movies. The station's original studios and transmitter were located on East 246th Street/State Road 213 in White River Township. WMCC continued to acquire more recent sitcoms, and added some talk and reality shows during the early 1990s. The station would later relocate its operations to a new studio facility on West 16th Street in Indianapolis.

On December 7, 1994, WMCC was sold for $10 million to Wabash Valley Broadcasting (making it a sister station to WTHI AM-FM-TV in Terre Haute and two Florida television stations), a company owned by the Hulman-George family, the longtime owners of Indianapolis Motor Speedway; the station's license was held by IMS Broadcasting, LLC during this time. The new owners changed channel 23's call letters to WNDY-TV on January 9, 1995 and rebranded the station "INDY-TV"; the station also began using a checkered flag as part of its logo – a nod to the Speedway and its signature Indianapolis 500 race, which covered the left diagonal line of the "W" in the calls. WNDY became a charter affiliate of The WB when the network launched two days later; the station eventually amended its branding to "INDY-TV WB 23" in reflection of the affiliation.

The Hulman-George family decided to sell WNDY-TV in 1997. Spartan Communications – which planned on turning over WNDY's operations to Fox affiliate WXIN (channel 59) under a local marketing agreement with Tribune Broadcasting – agreed to acquire the station in August 1997, only to back out of the deal an hour before it was scheduled to be finalized on October 3. Paxson Communications then made a $28.4 million offer for WNDY, before it was outbid by the Paramount Stations Group (now CBS Television Stations), which purchased the station for $35 million in October 1997; Paramount decided to buy the station after the Sinclair Broadcast Group signed an agreement to switch its UPN affiliates and independent stations to The WB, with UPN-affiliated WTTV (channel 4) and its Kokomo satellite WTTK (channel 29) slated to switch.

WNDY-TV began carrying UPN programming on January 22, 1998; initially, the station aired the network's programming on Thursdays, Fridays, and Saturdays, as it remained a WB affiliate. The move followed the expiration of WTTV's contract with UPN a week earlier. The sale to Paramount was finalized on February 4, 1998. Though channel 23's contract with The WB was originally slated to expire in January 1999, WB programming moved to WTTV on April 6, 1998; at that time, WNDY became a UPN owned-and-operated station and changed its branding to "UPN 23". With the switch, the station became the first O&O of a major commercial broadcast network in the Indianapolis market.

The station adopted the "UPN Indiana" branding in September 2003, dropping on-air references to its channel 23 allocation; this was done partly due to the fact that most cable providers in the Indianapolis market carry WNDY on channel 10. A few weeks before the start of the 2003–04 television season, WNDY began displaying a countdown of days until it rebranded as "UPN Indy". It was reported that the "UPN Indy" moniker was ditched in favor of "UPN Indiana" at the last minute to appeal to the larger audience across the state rather than just those living in the Indianapolis area, along with the fact that the Indianapolis Motor Speedway had stopped allowing the station to use the trademarked word "Indy". On February 10, 2005, Paramount sold WNDY and Columbus sister station WWHO to the LIN TV Corporation, owners of then-CBS affiliate WISH-TV (channel 8) and 24-hour weather service WIIH-CA (channel 17, now a fill-in translator for WISH), for $85 million; the station rebranded as "WNDY UPN 23" that July.

WNDY had previously been used as the calls for local radio station WBRI (1500 AM), and fictionally as the call sign of the television station in the 1990–91 CBS series WIOU (which predated channel 23's adoption of the WNDY calls by about four years) and for a fictional Chicago radio station in the 1992 Dolly Parton film Straight Talk.

As a MyNetworkTV affiliate
On January 24, 2006, CBS Corporation (which acquired UPN in its split from Viacom one month earlier) and the Warner Bros. Entertainment unit of Time Warner announced that they would dissolve UPN and The WB that September in favor of creating The CW, a new "fifth" network that would combine the programming from its respective predecessors. One month later on February 22, News Corporation announced the launch of another new network called MyNetworkTV; originally operated by its Fox Television Stations subsidiary and its Twentieth Television syndication division, it was designed to give UPN and WB affiliates that would not affiliate with The CW another option besides becoming independent stations. WTTV/WTTK was named as Indianapolis's CW outlet through an affiliation deal with that station's owner Tribune Broadcasting that covered 16 of the company's 19 WB stations at that time; WNDY was named as the market's MyNetworkTV affiliate in a four-station deal with LIN on April 26, 2006. Shortly before becoming a charter affiliate when MyNetworkTV launched on September 5, the station accordingly rebranded as "My INDY TV".

On May 18, 2007, LIN TV announced that it was exploring strategic alternatives that could have resulted in the sale of the company. On October 2, 2008, cable provider Bright House Networks pulled WISH-TV, WNDY and WIIH-CA from its Indianapolis area system as it and LIN had been unable to reach a new agreement for the stations regarding compensation for their carriage. WNDY and WISH were restored by Bright House as part of an agreement that was reached 20 days later on October 26.

On March 21, 2014, Media General announced that it would merge with LIN Media in a $1.6 billion deal. The merger was completed on December 19.

Sale to Nexstar
On September 8, 2015, Media General announced that it would acquire the Des Moines, Iowa–based Meredith Corporation for $2.4 billion with the intention to name the combined group Meredith Media General if the sale were finalized. However, on September 28, Irving, Texas-based Nexstar Broadcasting Group made an unsolicited cash-and-stock merger offer for Media General, originally valued at $14.50 per share. On November 16, following opposition to the merger with Meredith by minority shareholders Oppenheimer Holdings and Starboard Capital (primarily because Meredith's magazine properties were included in the deal, which would have re-entered Media General into publishing after it sold its newspapers to BH Media in 2012 to reduce debt) and the rejection of Nexstar's initial offer by company management, Media General agreed to enter into negotiations with Nexstar on a suitable counter deal, while the Meredith merger proposal remained active; the two eventually concluded negotiations on January 6, 2016, reaching a merger agreement for valued at $17.14 per share (an evaluation of $4.6 billion, plus the assumption of $2.3 billion debt).

On January 27, Meredith formally broke off the proposed merger with Media General and accepted the termination fee of $60 million previously negotiated under the original merger proposal; Media General subsequently signed an agreement to be acquired by Nexstar, in exchange for giving Meredith right of first refusal to acquire any broadcast or digital properties that may be divested (a clause that Meredith did not exercise). Because the FCC required Media General and Nexstar to divest stations in markets where both groups had television properties, the WISH-WNDY duopoly gained new sister stations in nearby markets within Indiana: the Evansville virtual duopoly of ABC affiliate WEHT and fellow CW affiliate WTVW, and the Terre Haute virtual duopoly of NBC affiliate WTWO and ABC affiliate WAWV-TV. CBS affiliate WANE-TV in Fort Wayne was the only existing sister station of WISH and WNDY that became part of the combined group, as Media General and Nexstar each sold certain Indiana stations they already owned (Nexstar's Fox affiliate WFFT-TV in Fort Wayne and Media General's two other Indiana-based CBS affiliates, WTHI-TV in Terre Haute and WLFI-TV in Lafayette) to Heartland Media to alleviate conflicts with FCC ownership rules. The transaction was approved by the FCC on January 11, 2017; the sale was completed on January 17, at which point the existing Nexstar stations and the former Media General outlets that neither group had to sell in order to rectify ownership conflicts in certain markets became part of the renamed Nexstar Media Group.

Sale to Circle City Broadcasting
On December 3, 2018, Nexstar announced it would acquire the assets of Chicago-based Tribune Media—which has owned Fox affiliate WXIN (channel 59) since July 1996 and CBS affiliate 
WTTV since July 2002—for $6.4 billion in cash and debt. Due to FCC ownership rules, Nexstar could not retain both duopolies. On April 8, 2019, it was announced that Circle City Broadcasting (owned by DuJuan McCoy of Indianapolis, the then-principal owner of the aforementioned, now defunct, Bayou City Broadcasting) would acquire WISH and WNDY for $42.5 million. The WTTV/WXIN duopoly was longer-established and Nexstar opted to keep that duopoly over WISH/WNDY. The sale was completed on September 19, 2019.

Programming
Syndicated programs broadcast by WNDY include The Doctors, Hot Bench and The Real. WNDY carried the Saturday edition of CBS This Morning, with the last broadcast on December 27, 2014, and the weekend editions of the CBS Evening News  and the second half-hour of Face the Nation both ending on December 28, 2014, in lieu of WISH-TV (in the case of the former two programs, WISH declined to air them in order to run expanded Saturday morning and weekend 6:00 p.m. newscasts). Occasionally as time permitted, WNDY aired other CBS programs that WISH-TV was unable to air due to extended breaking news or severe weather coverage, or other special programming, including certain NCAA men's basketball tournament games when more than one team of local interest is playing. As a result of WISH-TV losing the CBS affiliation, WNDY also stopped airing select CBS programs after December 28, 2014 (WTTV cleared the entire CBS schedule upon joining the network on January 1, 2015).

The Hoosier Lottery awarded WNDY the rights to televise its daily drawings the following year, assuming the contract from WTTV, which had been airing the drawings since 1989; WTTV would regain the broadcast contact to the drawings in 1999, before losing them again when the lottery discontinued the televised draws in 2001.

Sports programming
In 1995, the Indiana High School Athletic Association awarded WNDY the broadcast contract to air the statewide boys and girls high school basketball tournament games; after the station terminated its contract with the IHSAA in August 1999 due to declining overall interest in the tournament, the organization filed a breach of contract lawsuit against WNDY in March 2000, seeking $3.28 million in damages.

WNDY occasionally aired Indianapolis Colts games that are televised on ESPN's Monday Night Football, as NFL regulations require games that air on one of the league's cable partners to be simulcast on a broadcast television station in each participating team's home market (the station had been carrying ESPN's Colts game telecasts since it held rights to the Sunday Night Football package, which it lost to NBC in 2006, when ESPN took over rights to Monday Night Football). One notable exception to this occurred in October 2013, when WTHR (channel 13) carried an ESPN-televised Monday night game involving the Colts. The station also aired selected Ball State University men's basketball games as well as Mid-American Conference college football from ESPN Plus.

In March 2015, Media General announced that WISH and WNDY would become part of the Chicago Cubs and White Sox broadcast television networks and carry many of the games the teams will broadcast locally in Chicago among WLS-TV, WGN-TV and WPWR-TV, though not those broadcast by NBC Sports Chicago. WISH will have a Sunday-only schedule of games due to the contractual restrictions of their CW affiliation, with WNDY airing the remainder of the weekday schedule of games and a few Sundays. The deal for carriage of the games in Indianapolis was required after Tribune Media discontinued airing Chicago area sports over WGN America at the end of 2014. In October 2015, this agreement was expanded to include select Chicago Blackhawks hockey games as well.

Newscasts
In early 1996, NBC affiliate WTHR entered into a news share agreement with WNDY to produce a nightly half-hour primetime newscast at 10 p.m. for the station, titled Eyewitness News at 10:00 on Indy TV (the title later being revised slightly to correspond with WNDY's branding changes to "UPN 23" in 1998 and "UPN Indiana" in 2002), which debuted on March 16 of that year. The program originally competed against two longer-established 10 p.m. newscasts: WXIN's then 35-minute in-house newscast and another outsourced newscast on WTTV that was produced by ABC affiliate WRTV (channel 6) (the latter newscast was cancelled in December 2002, after WXIN owner Tribune Broadcasting acquired WTTV).

WTHR terminated the news share agreement after WNDY was acquired by LIN TV; WISH-TV assumed production responsibilities for the newscast on February 28, 2005, relaunching the program as 24-Hour News 8 at 10:00 on UPN Indiana (as was the case under the WTHR news share agreement, the program's title was later revised slightly to correspond with WNDY's branding changes to "WNDY UPN" in September 2005 and then "My INDY TV" upon the station's switch to MyNetworkTV in September 2006). The WNDY newscast briefly gained another competitor on that date when WTHR moved the Eyewitness News at 10:00 broadcast to sister station WALV-CD (channel 46); that program was subsequently moved to Pax TV owned-and-operated station WIPX-TV (channel 63, now an Ion Television O&O) on April 13, 2005, before being cancelled two months later on June 30. On September 8, 2008, WISH-TV became the second television station in the state of Indiana and the Indianapolis market to begin broadcasting its local newscasts in high definition; the WNDY newscast was included in the upgrade.

On January 5, 2009, WISH-TV began producing an hour-long extension of its weekday morning newscast for WNDY, running from 7 to 8 a.m. The station also began producing a weekly interview program produced by WISH, One on One with Mike Ahern, which was hosted by the former WISH-TV anchor; airing Thursdays at 10:30 p.m. (with a rebroadcast Saturdays at 7 p.m.), the program was cancelled in mid-2013. In 2012, the Sunday edition of the 10 p.m. newscast was expanded to one hour; the Monday through Saturday editions would follow suit on January 6, 2014, with the final 15 minutes of the program being padded out by a sports highlight program titled Sports Zone Tonight.

On January 1, 2015, WISH ceased producing newscasts specifically aired only WNDY, as it moved the 7 a.m. and 10 p.m. newscasts to channel 8 when it lost CBS programming and became the market's CW affiliate on that date. 

Currently, the station simulcasts the 6-10 a.m. block of Daybreak,  and the 10-11:30 p.m. newscasts from WISH-TV, along with a replay of Life.Style.Live at 2 p.m.

Notable current on-air staff
 Derek Daly – auto racing expert

Technical information

Subchannels
The station's digital signal is multiplexed:

WNDY formerly carried TheCoolTV on its second digital subchannel from 2010 to 2013, when LIN Media terminated its affiliation agreement with the music video network.

Analog-to-digital conversion
In October 2002, WNDY began transmitting a digital signal on UHF channel 32. WNDY-TV shut down its analog signal, over UHF channel 23, on June 12, 2009, the official date in which full-power television stations in the United States transitioned from analog to digital broadcasts under federal mandate. The station's digital signal continued to broadcast on its pre-transition UHF channel 32. Through the use of PSIP, digital television receivers display the station's virtual channel as its former UHF analog channel 23. The station's former analog-era channel 23 allocation was then used by Muncie PBS member station WIPB (channel 49) for its post-transition digital signal.

References

External links

MyNetworkTV affiliates
Bounce TV affiliates
Mass media in Indianapolis
NDY-TV
Television channels and stations established in 1984
1984 establishments in Indiana
Marion, Indiana